Luo Dongjin (born February 12, 1939) is a lieutenant general (zhongjiang) in the People's Liberation Army. He was Deputy Political Commissar of the PLA Second Artillery Corps between November 1997 and November 2002. He was promoted to the rank of major general (shaojiang) in September 1998 and lieutenant general (zhongjiang) in July 1999.

Early life and education
He is the third of six children, the others being: Luo Beitun, Luo Lin, Luo Nanxia, Luo Beijie, and Luo Ning. In 1959 he entered the Harbin Institute of Military Engineering (now National University of Defense Technology), majoring in missile engineering, where he graduated in 1965.

Career
He enlisted in the People's Liberation Army (PLA) in 1959. After university, he was assigned to the Seventh Ministry of Machinery Industry as a researcher. He served in the PLA Second Artillery Corps since 1976, what he was promoted to Political Commissar of its Logistics Department in June 1990 and to Deputy Political Commissar in November 1997.

He was a delegate to the 6th National People's Congress. He was a member of the 11th National Committee of the Chinese People's Political Consultative Conference.

Personal life
He married Pan Zhongwen, a military officer in the  General Political Department of the People's Liberation Army. The couple has a son and a daughter.

Book

References

1939 births
Living people
People from Hengdong County
National University of Defense Technology alumni
People's Liberation Army generals from Hunan
Delegates to the 6th National People's Congress